Briana Loves Jenna is a 2001 pornographic film starring Briana Banks and Jenna Jameson, written and directed by Jay Grdina under the stage name "Justin Sterling".

History
It was the first film produced by Club Jenna, and was successful, winning twin AVN Awards for best selling and best renting pornographic title of 2002. It cost US$280,000 to make and grossed over $1 million in its first year. It marked Jameson's return to pornography after a hiatus of several years, and was advertised on the boxcover as "Jenna. Her first boy/girl scene in over 2 years."

This was the first film made by Jameson after her marriage to Grdina, and she had previously told him that she would do female/female scenes only in the future. However, realizing the film would be a success only if there were female/male scenes, she said the only male she would film a female/male scene with would be Grdina, which he agreed to.

Awards and nominations

References

External links
 
 Briana Loves Jenna at IAFD
 

2001 films
2000s English-language films
2000s pornographic films
Jenna Jameson
2000s American films